Anarta obesula is a species of cutworm or dart moth in the family Noctuidae first described by Smith in 1904. It is found in North America.

The MONA or Hodges number for Anarta obesula is 10231.

References

Further reading

 
 
 

Anarta (moth)
Articles created by Qbugbot
Moths described in 1904